Dzhengal is a peak on the Bulgarian Pirin mountain range. It is situated in one of the external ridges of the mountain, the Polejan Ridge, between the Dzhengal Gate and Momin Dvor Peak and towers to the west of the Popovo Lake. It is 2,730 m high, which places it in the top 10 peaks in the range. 

Dzhengal is a granite peak that can be climbed from three points. The easiest track starts from the Samodivski Lakes and ascends towards Momin Dvor. The other ways are more difficult and require fine preparation and experience.

Name
According to the most popular version, the name derives from the Turkish word dzhangal which means sheep without lamb. When the herds were sheared, those sheep were marked with pendants. If the peak is viewed from the Bezbog refuge it looks like there is a pendant attached to it. 

Another legend says that the peak is named after the son of God Perun, Dzhengal. When the evil god Bes (Bez) decided to kidnap Perun's daughter while she was playing around the Samodivski Lakes, her brother guessed his intention and, after a fierce fight, defeated Bez and covered him with stones on the Bezbog Peak (which in Bulgarian means God Bez or without God).

References 

Mountains of Pirin
Landforms of Blagoevgrad Province
Two-thousanders of Bulgaria